Dishonored is a 1931 pre-Code romantic spy film about a female spy for Austria-Hungary during World War I. It was co-written (with Daniel N. Rubin), directed, and edited by Josef von Sternberg for Paramount Pictures. The costume design was by Travis Banton. The film stars Marlene Dietrich, Victor McLaglen, Gustav von Seyffertitz, and Warner Oland.

Plot
The story opens in 1915 on the streets of Vienna, Austria, in war-torn Europe. The corpse of a prostitute is removed by the authorities from a tenement building in the red-light district – a case of suicide. When Marie Kolverer, a fellow streetwalker, offers a word of sympathy, the concierge warns that she is destined to suffer the same fate. She responds: "No I am not. I am not afraid of life... Although I am not afraid of death, either."

The Chief of Austrian Secret Service overhears Marie's remark. He approaches her, and she invites him up to her flat, assuming the elderly man is engaging her for sex. The Chief discovers Marie is a war widow, as well as an accomplished pianist, and is very attached to her pet black cat. He poses as a foreign agent to test her loyalty and, to his satisfaction, she quietly alerts a constable. The gentleman establishes his credentials and invites Marie to see him at central intelligence headquarters.

In the Chief's office, he explains to Marie that Austrian military forces have been suffering terrible losses due to a security leak, and he has been on the lookout for an attractive female to serve as a secret agent to help expose the man he thinks is the traitor: Colonel von Hindau, who is attached to the chief of staff of the Austrian army. The Chief says he thinks Marie may be right for the job. She accepts the offer, remarking that, rather than the generous compensation the Chief promises, what primarily appeals to her is the opportunity to serve "the cause of Austria." Marie is enlisted in the Secret Service as Agent X-27.

Marie/X-27 attracts Hindau's attention at a masquerade ball and gets invited back to his private apartment. During her faux seduction, the Chief places a telephone call to Hindau, requiring that he briefly absent himself and leaving X-27 free to search his personal belongings. When his butler mentions that Hindau does not smoke, she remembers that the man who Hindau dropped off on the way home from the ball had given Hindau a cigarette, which she finds and from which she removes a secret message. Hindau returns from his phone call and, discovering his cover is blown, offers his compliments to X-27, retrieves his service revolver, and kills himself.

The secret message leads X-27 to a casino, where she finds the man who had given Hindau the cigarette, who turns out to be Colonel Kranau, a Russian spy. They flirt for a bit before, sensing danger, he escapes. When X-27 reports her failure, the Chief orders her to disengage, saying that Kranau "is too clever to be trapped by a woman."

Later than night, Kranau breaks into X-27's apartment while she is loudly playing the piano and discovers the orders for her next assignment: to fly over the Polish border, infiltrate the Russian military headquarters there, and acquire the timetable for an imminent military offensive. He then empties her pistol and disables the telephone before confronting her. They flirt a bit more before X-27 calls Kranau a clown, to which he responds that he is a soldier who sometimes crosses enemy lines and engages in subterfuge, whereas she uses her sexuality to "trick men into death". She attempts to delay him with a kiss, but he flees rather than risk falling in love with a "devil".

Behind enemy lines and accompanied by her black cat, X-27 disguises herself as a dimwitted peasant girl and gains employment as a chambermaid in the Russian officers' quarters. She quickly seduces a Russian senior officer, Colonel Kovrin, with liquor and sex play, and obtains the top secret plans for the attack, which she copies in a code that looks like it is sheet music for a musical composition. Kranau, who is stationed at the quarters, observes X-27's black cat stalking the hallway, alerting him to her presence. After a brief chase, he captures her and discovers the sheet music. When he performs the atonal piece on the piano, he realizes it is a code and promptly burns the score, confident he has thwarted X-27's mission.

Kranau informs X-27 that she will be put to death the next morning, but discovers he has fallen in love with her. After they spend the night together, X-27 manages to drug Kranau and make her escape back to Austria. She had committed the coded musical notation to memory when Kranau played it, so she is able to reconstruct the plans. Armed with this information, the Austrians crush the Russian offensive.

Thousands of Russian troops are captured, Kranau among them. When Austrian secret service agents, with X-27 in attendance, examine the prisoners, Kranau is identified as Agent H-14 and taken into custody. X-27 pretends not to know him, but requests that she be allowed to interrogate him privately, ostensibly to extract valuable information before he is summarily executed. Loath to see her lover lose his life, she "accidentally" drops her gun, permitting him to escape. She is arrested, convicted of treason, and sentenced to death.

Marie makes two requests of a monk that visits her while she is awaiting execution: that she be furnished with a piano in her cell, and that she be permitted to wear the clothing in which she "served, not my country, but my countrymen" (that is, what she wore as a streetwalker). Both requests are granted.

Standing before the firing squad, Marie declines a blindfold and coolly applies lipstick. After a short delay caused by a futile protest from a youthful officer, she is shot.

Cast

Production

Sternberg based his "espionage melodrama" loosely on the exploits and demise of Dutch spy Mata Hari, with screenplay by Daniel Nathan Rubin. The title "Dishonored" was conferred upon the film by studio executives over Sternberg's objections. He said "the lady spy was not dishonored, but killed by firing squad", and felt the chosen title would distort the significance of the heroine's death.

The movie was rushed into production by Paramount to capitalize on the critical and popular success of Sternberg's films The Blue Angel and Morocco the previous year, both of which starred Marlene Dietrich. Oscar-winners Lee Garmes (cinematography) and Hans Dreier (un-credited art direction) served on the film.

M-G-M studios, alarmed by the competition that the Sternberg-Dietrich phenomena posed to star Greta Garbo, responded with the copycat Mata Hari the same year.

Production schedules, as well as some reticence on the part of actor Gary Cooper to again work with the demanding director, prevented Sternberg from casting Cooper opposite Dietrich. His substitute, actor Victor McLaglen, was not as popular a co-star for Dietrich.

Theme

Sternberg's disdain for the strutting, medal-bedecked militarists and addiction to political intrigue is contrasted with the purity of a woman's feminine code of honor and "her love which transcends the trivial issue of politics." In the following exchange, the Court Officers pass judgment on the despised former spy X-27, "the only life-giving force in their midst":

As film historian Andrew Sarris observes: "Yet it is Dietrich who ultimately passes judgment on her judges by choosing to die as a woman without a cause in a picture without a moral."

References

Sources 
 Chicago Film Society. Dishonored at the Portage Theatre. May 14, 2011. Retrieved May 17, 2018. http://www.chicagofilmsociety.org/2011/05/
 Kehr, Dave. 2012. That Well-Lighted Agent of Desire. New York Times, May 3, 2012. Retrieved May 17, 2018. https://www.nytimes.com/2012/03/04/movies/homevideo/marlene-dietrichs-dishonored-and-shanghai-express.html
 Richey, Jeremy. 2008. Overlooked Classics: Dishonored. Moon in the Gutter, March 2, 2008. Retrieved May 17, 2018. http://mooninthegutter.blogspot.com/2008/03/overlooked-classic-of-week-dishonored.html
 Sarris, Andrew. 1966. The Films of Josef von Sternberg. Museum of Modern Art/Doubleday. New York, New York.
 White, Brynn. 2010. Dishonored'. Not Coming to a Theatre Near You, August 19, 2010. Retrieved May 17, 2018. http://www.notcoming.com/reviews/dishonored/

External links

 Eye Film Instituut Nederland. Dishonored'' film clip, Final Scene. https://www.youtube.com/watch?v=lZUdons9m5g Retrieved May 17, 2018.

Still at gettyimages.com

1931 films
1931 romantic drama films
1930s spy films
American romantic drama films
American spy films
Films directed by Josef von Sternberg
Paramount Pictures films
World War I spy films
American black-and-white films
Films set in the Russian Empire
Films set in Austria-Hungary
Films scored by Karl Hajos
Films set in 1915
1930s English-language films
1930s American films